Pickle Lake Water Aerodrome  is located adjacent to Pickle Lake, Ontario, Canada.

See also
 Pickle Lake Airport

References

Registered aerodromes in Kenora District
Seaplane bases in Ontario